The use of flag icons, particularly national flags, for languages is a common practice. Such icons have long been used on tourist attraction signage, and elsewhere in the tourism space, but have found wider use in website localization where UX limitations have become apparent.

Mixed flags 

Sometimes the flags of international language communities, such as the Flag of the Community of Portuguese Language Countries or the flag of the Organisation internationale de la Francophonie can be used, but they are not as widely recognised as national flags. Where more than one country is a major user of a language, a flag divided diagonally may be used, such as the flags of Brazil and Portugal to indicate the Portuguese language; Brazilians may be offended by the use of their former colonial master's flag to symbolise the Portuguese language, as there are far more speakers of it in Brazil (over 200 million) than in Portugal (10 million).

Writing systems 
Where two written standards exist for a single language, national flags can be used to distinguish between them: for example, the Flag of Taiwan for Traditional Chinese and the Flag of the People's Republic of China for Simplified Chinese.

Political motivations 

Some Euronet ATMs (automated teller machines) display the Irish flag as a symbol for the English language (usually UK flag or English flag). In the media, this was speculated to be a response to Brexit, with the Republic of Ireland as one of the only two Anglophone nations left in the European Union (another being Malta). Dr Oetker have been observed doing the same. The Irish flag is more usually used to signify the Irish language.

Criticism 
The use of flag icons for languages has been criticized as poor design. The symbolism of a national flag introduces politicization, and often ambiguity.

Belying the nation-state concept, many languages are natively spoken in several countries, and many countries have several major languages. Alternatives include using the native names of languages or their language codes, possibly under a generic symbol of translation such as the Language Icon.

Gallery

See also 

 Language Icon

References

External links

Flags are not languages (blog)

Computer icons
Internationalization and localization
Language identifiers
Pictograms
Representations of flags